Parocystola is a genus of moths of the family Oecophoridae.

Species
Parocystola acroxantha (Meyrick, 1885)
Parocystola eubrocha (Turner, 1946)
Parocystola holodryas (Lower, 1899)
Parocystola leucospora Turner, 1896
Parocystola solae (Walsingham, 1911)

References

Markku Savela's ftp.funet.fi

 
Oecophorinae
Moth genera